Men's Time Trial at the 2004 Summer Olympics (Cycling):

Medalists

Of the top riders, it soon became clear that Sydney 2000 time trial gold medal winner Russian rider Viatcheslav Ekimov was setting the time to beat. The current world time trial champion, Michael Rogers from Australia, appeared to match Ekimov's times, but faded in the final kilometres. Tyler Hamilton, from the US, had problems with his radio shortly after the start, and rode the race effectively without radio communication. Hamilton finished strongly claiming the gold medal for the US, averaging 50.062 km/h to finish the 48 km course in 57:31.74. Ekimov was awarded the silver medal, with a time of 57:50.58 nearly 19 seconds behind Hamilton, with another American, Bobby Julich, in a time of 57:58.19 inching out Michael Rogers (58:01.67) for the bronze medal.

Michael Rich (58:09.46) from Germany finished 37 seconds behind Hamilton for fifth, with Kazakhstan rider Alexander Vinokourov finishing sixth. The last person to start, the 2000 Olympics road race winner and former world time trial champion Jan Ullrich from Germany, could not match the pace and ended with a time of 59:02.04 in seventh position.

On 20 May 2011, the Wall Street Journal reported that Hamilton returned his gold medal to the U.S. Anti-Doping Agency after Hamilton acknowledged to 60 Minutes that he used doping products during his career. The International Olympic Committee responded in August 2012 by stripping Hamilton of his medal.

On 5 September 2012, Random House (Bantam Books) published Hamilton's memoir The Secret Race: Inside the Hidden World of the Tour de France: Doping, Cover-ups, and Winning at All Costs, coauthored with American writer Daniel Coyle. It won the 2012 William Hill Sports Book of the Year award. In the book, he details his career and his relationship with Lance Armstrong, for whom he was a teammate and a confidant. It also details some of the doping practices he and Armstrong were using on the USP team, such as EPO injections and blood transfusions. They parted ways when Hamilton went riding for CSC. This decision was motivated by the fact that Armstrong had become cold and vindictive toward him. Hamilton then recounts the 2 years spent riding for Bjarne Riis, his sympathy for the former rider and how Riis introduced him to Eufemiano Fuentes, a Spanish doctor who would be later investigated in the Operacion Puerto doping affair. He then recounts his years on the Phonak Team when he tested positive during the Vuelta a España to an alleged homologous blood transfusion.

Despite admitting throughout the work that he very regularly used EPO, testosterone pills and patches, and autologous blood transfusions, Hamilton staunchly opposed the sanction, since he had never used the blood of another person. It was speculated that Fuentes and his assistant had mixed the blood of another rider with his. His career in shambles, he raced for lesser teams after his suspension, tested positive for DHEA (in an OTC herbal anti-depressant) and retired. He later received a call from United States federal investigator Jeff Novitzky, who wanted to talk to him. He refused and was served a subpoena, whereupon he decided to tell everything. Some former teammates of Lance Armstrong and other witnesses appeared, until the federal government dropped the charges. The USADA took over the investigation under civil law, and Armstrong was ultimately stripped of all his titles from August 1998 onward. Armstrong was also banned from bicycle racing and triathlon competition.

Results

(DNS/F = Did Not Start/Finish)

References
Official Olympic Report

M
Cycling at the Summer Olympics – Men's individual time trial
Vouliagmeni Olympic Centre events
Men's events at the 2004 Summer Olympics